Washington Hispanic is a Spanish-language newspaper in the Washington DC area. The company Washington Hispanic Inc. has its headquarters in Silver Spring, Maryland

The paper was founded in 1994 by Johnny Yataco. As of 2019 the circulation in the DC area was 45,000. In the 2010 elections, the paper endorsed Mayor of the District of Columbia Adrian Fenty.

References

External links

 Washington Hispanic 

1994 establishments in Maryland
Mass media in Washington, D.C.
Newspapers published in Maryland
Non-English-language newspapers published in Maryland
Publications established in 1994
Silver Spring, Maryland
Spanish-language mass media in Maryland
Spanish-language newspapers published in the United States